Cerebrolysin (developmental code name FPF-1070) is a mixture of enzymatically treated peptides derived from pig brain whose constituents can include brain-derived neurotrophic factor (BDNF), glial cell line-derived neurotrophic factor (GDNF), nerve growth factor (NGF), and ciliary neurotrophic factor (CNTF).

Cerebrolysin has also been studied for potential use with a wide variety of neurodegenerative disorders, though research is preliminary. Cochrane reviews suggest no benefit in the treatment of acute stroke and an increased rate of spontaneous adverse events requiring hospitalization. Conversely, reviews suggest positive effect when cerebrolysin is used with vascular dementia. All Cochrane analyses to date stress that these relationships needed to be confirmed by further high quality clinical trials.

Research

Stroke
Reviews suggest no benefit for treatment of acute ischemic stroke with cerebrolysin, though they also emphasize the need for further high quality studies. In addition, cerebrolysin use was associated with a higher rate of spontaneous adverse events requiring hospitalization. Studies of ischemic stroke in Asian subpopulations also found an absence of benefit.

An early study also suggested a lack of benefit with hemorrhagic stroke related to cerebral aneurysm.

Dementia
Reviews of preliminary research indicate a possible improvement in cognitive function using cerebrolysin for vascular dementia and Alzheimer's disease, although further high-quality research is needed.

Other
Early studies have suggested potential use of cerebrolysin with a wide variety of neurodegenerative disorders, including traumatic brain injury, schizophrenia, multiple sclerosis, cerebral palsy and spinal cord injury though research is still preliminary.

Adverse effects
In trials studying the use of cerebrolysin after acute stroke, there was no increased risk of "serious adverse events" requiring hospitalization. These were specifically defined as:

"...any untoward medical occurrence that, at any dose, resulted in death, [was] life‐threatening, required inpatient hospitalisation or resulted in prolongation of existing hospitalisation, resulted in persistent or significant disability/incapacity, [was] a congenital anomaly/birth defect, or [was] a medically important event or reaction”.

Mechanism of action
In vitro and animal studies suggest neurotrophic effects of cerebrolysin similar to endogenous neurotrophic factors, though its specific molecular pharmacodynamics are not clear. Studies of dementia suggest decreased beta-amyloid deposition.

Regulatory

Cerebrolysin is not a scheduled drug in the United States.

References

Antidementia agents
Neuroprotective agents
Nootropics
Peptides